Austin Friars, formerly Austin Friars St Monica's School, is an independent day school, located in Carlisle, Cumbria.

Austin Friars may also refer to:
Austin Friars, London, a former friary in London
Austin Friars, Newcastle-upon-Tyne, a friary in Tyne and Wear, England
Austin Friars, King's Lynn, a friary in Norfolk, England
Dutch Church, Austin Friars, City of London

See also
Augustinians, a Christian order based on the rules of St. Augustine of Hippo
Order of Saint Augustine (Augustinian Friars or Austin Friars), a Catholic religious order